The Filmfare Best Supporting Actress Award is given by the Filmfare magazine as part of its annual Filmfare Awards South for Malayalam films.

Superlatives

Winners
{| cellspacing="1" cellpadding="1" border="0" width="50%"
|- bgcolor="#d1e4fd"
! Year || Supporting Actress ||Role|| Film
|-
|2018
|Savithri Sreedharan
|Jameela
|Sudani From Nigeria
|-
|2017||Shanthi Krishna||Sheela Chacko||Njandukalude Nattil Oridavela
|-
| 2016 || Asha Sarath||Suma Raghu|| Anuraga Karikkin Vellam
|-
| 2015 || Lena ||Pathumma|| Ennu Ninte Moideen
|-
| 2014 || Parvathy Thiruvothu ||RJ Sarah|| Bangalore Days
|- bgcolor=#edf3fe
| 2013 || Asha Sarath ||IG Geetha Prabhakar|| Drishyam
|-
| 2012 || Gauthami Nair ||Lakshmi|| Diamond Necklace
|- bgcolor=#edf3fe
| 2011 || Lena  ||Shruthi|| Traffic
|-
| 2010 || Urvashi ||Clara || Mummy & Me
|- bgcolor=#edf3fe
| 2009 || Padmapriya Janakiraman  ||Neeli|| Pazhassiraja
|-
| 2008 ||Sukanya||Theresa|| Innathe Chintha Vishayam
|- bgcolor=#edf3fe
| 2007 || Lakshmi Gopalaswamy ||Moosa's lover
|Paradesi
|-
| 2006 || Roma ||Sarah Elizabeth|| Notebook
|-
|2004 || Kpac lalitha|||| Manassinakkare
|- bgcolor=#edf3fe
|}

Nominations
2008 Sukanya – Innathe Chintha Vishayam
 Geetu Mohandas – Akasha Gopuram Mohini – Innathe Chintha Vishayam Roma – Minnaminnikoottam Samvrutha Sunil – Thirakkatha2009 Padmapriya – Pazhassi Raja
 Lakshmi Gopalaswamy – Bhramaram Lakshmi Rai – Evidam Swargamanu Samvrutha Sunil – Neelathaamara Sona Nair – Passenger2010 Urvashi – Mummy & Me
 KPAC Lalitha – Elsamma Enna Aankutty Lakshmi Gopalaswamy – Shikkar Lakshmi Priya – Kadha Thudarunnu Vinaya Prasad – Marykkundoru Kunjaadu2011 Lena – Traffic
Meghna Raj – BeautifulMythili – Salt N' PepperNithya Menen – UrumiRamya Nambeeshan – Chappa Kurish2012 Gauthami Nair – Diamond Necklace
 Samvrutha Sunil – Diamond Necklace KPAC Lalitha – Nidra Mythili – Ee Adutha Kalathu Rashmi Satheesh – 22 Female Kottayam2013 Asha Sarath – Drishyam
 Bindu Panicker – Pullipulikalum Aattinkuttiyum Geetha – Zachariayude Garbhinikal Lena – Left Right Left Sanusha – Zachariayude Garbhinikal2014 Parvathy Thiruvothu – Bangalore Days
 Muthumani – Njaan Lena – Vikramadithyan Sajitha Madathil – Njaan Sethu Lakshmi – How Old Are You?2015 Lena – Ennu Ninte Moideen
 Ann Augustine – Nee-Na Aparna Gopinath – Charlie Miya – Anarkali Namitha Pramod – Chandrettan Evideya2016 Asha Sarath – Anuraga Karikkin Vellam
 Abhija Sivakala – Ozhivudivasathe Kali Aparna Balamurali – Maheshinte Prathikaaram Lakshmi Ramakrishnan – Jacobinte Swargarajyam Rohini – Guppy 2017 Shanthi Krishna – Njandukalude Nattil Oridavela
 Aishwarya Rajesh – Jomonte Suvisheshangal Anna Rajan  – Angamaly Diaries Aparna Balamurali – Sarvopari Palakkaran Srinda – Sherlock Toms2018 Savithri Sreedharan – Sudani from Nigeria
 Muthumani – Uncle Nimisha Sajayan – Oru Kuprasidha Payyan 
 Pauly Valsan – Ee.Ma.Yau Sarasa Balussery – Sudani from Nigeria''

References

External links

Supporting Actress
Film awards for supporting actress